Fort St. James/Stuart River Water Aerodrome  is located adjacent to Fort St. James on the Stuart River, British Columbia, Canada.

See also
Fort St. James (Perison) Airport

References

Seaplane bases in British Columbia
Regional District of Bulkley-Nechako
Registered aerodromes in British Columbia